Yaronia is a genus of sea snails, marine gastropod mollusks in the family Colloniidae, the turban snails.

Species
Species within the genus Yaronia include:
 Yaronia albobrunnea (Bozzetti, 2014)
 Yaronia gestroi (Caramagna, 1888)
 Yaronia pyropus (Reeve, 1848) (species inquirenda)

References

 Mienis H.K. (2011), Remarks concerning Turbo pustulatus, Turbo pyropus and Collonia gestroi, with the description of Yaronia: a new genus for a small turbinid species from the Red Sea (Mollusca, Gastropoda, Turbinidae). Triton [Journal of the Israel Malacological Society] 23: 1-4.
 Huang S.-I, Fu I-F. & Poppe G.T. (2016). Taiwanese and Philippine Colloniidae. Nomenclatural remarks and the description of 17 new species (Gastropoda: Colloniidae). Visaya. 4(5): 4-42.

External links
 To World Register of Marine Species

 
Colloniidae